Snowdome is an indoor ski slope in Tamworth, Staffordshire, England.

Snowdome may also refer to:

 Snowdome Adelaide, a former indoor ski slope in Adelaide, Australia
 Dubai Snowdome, an indoor ski slope in Dubailand, Dubai
 "Snowdome" (song), a song by Kaela Kimura

See also
 Snow globe, a transparent sphere enclosing a miniaturized scene
 Snow Dome (disambiguation)